The Greenland shark (Somniosus microcephalus), also known as the gurry shark, grey shark, or by the Kalaallisut name eqalussuaq, is a large shark of the family Somniosidae ("sleeper sharks"), closely related to the Pacific and southern sleeper sharks. Greenland shark is a potentially important yet poorly studied cold-water species inhabiting the North Atlantic and Arctic Oceans. 

The Greenland shark has the longest known lifespan of all vertebrate species (estimated to be between 250 and 500 years), and is among the largest extant species of shark. It is a generalist feeder, consuming a variety of available foods. As an adaptation to living at depth, it has a high concentration of trimethylamine N-oxide in its tissues, which causes the meat to be toxic. Greenland shark flesh, treated to reduce toxin levels, is eaten in Iceland as a delicacy known as kæstur hákarl. As it lives in the cold depths of the Arctic and North Atlantic, isolated from human activity, it is not known to be a threat to humans, and no attacks have been recorded.

Description
The Greenland shark is one of the largest living species of shark.

Males are typically smaller than females. The Greenland shark is a thickset species, with a short, rounded snout, small eyes, and very small dorsal and pectoral fins. The gill openings are very small for the species' great size.

Coloration can range from pale creamy-gray to blackish-brown and the body is typically uniform in color, though whitish spots or faint dark streaks are occasionally seen on the back.

Dentition

When feeding on large carcasses, the shark employs a rolling motion of its jaw. The 48–52 teeth of the upper jaw are very thin and pointed, lacking serrations. These upper jaw teeth act as an anchor while the lower jaw proceeds to cut massive chunks out of the prey.

The 48–52 lower teeth are interlocking and are broad and square, containing short, smooth cusps that point outward. Teeth in the two halves of the lower jaw are strongly pitched in opposite directions.

Behaviour

Diet
The Greenland shark is an apex predator and mostly eats fish, and has been observed actively hunting seals in Canada. The prey found in the stomachs of Greenland sharks is an indicator of the active hunting patterns of these predators. Recorded fish prey have included smaller sharks, skates, eels, herring, capelin, Arctic char, cod, rosefish, sculpins, lumpfish, wolffish, and flounder. The largest of these sharks were found having eaten redfish, as well as other higher trophic level prey.

Greenland sharks, because of their slow speeds, often hunt prey that are asleep. Using their cryptic coloration, they can approach prey undetected before closing the remaining distance by opening their large buccal cavity in order to create a suction that draws in the prey. This is the likely explanation as to why the gut contents discovered in Greenland sharks are often whole prey specimens.

Greenland sharks have also been found with remains of seals, polar bears, moose, and reindeer (in one case an entire reindeer body) in their stomachs. The Greenland shark is known to be a scavenger, and is attracted by the smell of rotting meat in the water. The sharks have frequently been observed gathering around fishing boats. They also scavenge on seals.

Although such a large shark could easily consume a human swimmer, the frigid waters it typically inhabits make the likelihood of attacks on people very low; no cases of predation on humans have been verified.

Movement
As an ectotherm living in a just-above-freezing environment, the Greenland shark has the lowest swim speed and tail-beat frequency for its size across all fish species, which most likely correlates with its very slow metabolism and extreme longevity. Because this top speed is a fraction of that of a typical seal in their diet, biologists are uncertain how the sharks are able to prey on the seals. It is hypothesized that they may ambush them while they sleep.

Greenland sharks migrate annually based on depth and temperature rather than distance, although some do travel. During the winter, the sharks congregate in the shallows (up to 80° north) for warmth but migrate separately in summer to the deeps or even farther south. Daily vertical migration between shallower and deeper waters has also been recorded.

Four previous records of Greenland shark were reported from Cuba and the northern Gulf of Mexico.

In April 2022, a large Somniosus shark was caught and subsequently released on Glover's Reef off the coast of Belize. This shark was identified as being either a Greenland shark or a Greenland/Pacific sleeper shark hybrid. This observation is notable for being the first possible record of a Greenland shark from the Western Caribbean, and being caught on a nearshore coral reef (the only other record of this species from the Caribbean was made from a deep-water habitat off the Caribbean coast of Colombia). The discovery indicates that Greenland sharks may have a wider distribution in the tropics, primarily at greater depths, than previously believed.

Other behaviours 
The shark is often infested by the copepod Ommatokoita elongata, a crustacean which attaches itself to the shark's eyes. It was speculated that the copepod may display bioluminescence and thus attract prey for the shark in a mutualistic relationship, but this hypothesis has not been verified. These parasites also damage the eyeball in a number of ways, leading to almost complete blindness. This does not seem to reduce the life expectancy or predatory ability of Greenland sharks, due to their strong reliance on smell and hearing. The shark occupies what tends to be a very deep environment seeking its preferred cold water habitat.

Longevity
The Greenland shark has the longest known lifespan of all vertebrate species. One Greenland shark was tagged off the coast of Greenland in 1936 and recaptured in 1952. The oldest of the animals sampled, which was also the largest, had lived for 392 ± 120 years, and was consequently born between 1504 and 1744. The authors further concluded that the species reaches sexual maturity at about 150 years of age. Efforts to conserve Greenland sharks are particularly important due to their extreme longevity, long maturation periods, and the heightened sensitivity of large shark populations.

Reproduction
As recently as 1957, females were found not to deposit eggs in the bottom mud, but retain the developing embryos within their bodies so they are born alive (a process known as ovoviviparity) after an estimated gestation period of 8–18 years. Within a Greenland shark's uterus, villi serve a key function in supplying oxygen to embryos. It is speculated that due to embryonic metabolism dealing with reproduction, this only allows for a limited litter size of around 10 pups. It has been estimated that due to their extreme longevity, Greenland sharks can have 200 to 700 pups during their lifetime.

Physiological adaptations

Like other elasmobranchii, Greenland sharks have high concentrations of the two nitrogenous compounds urea and trimethylamine N-oxide (TMAO) in their tissues, which increase their buoyancy and function as osmoprotectants. TMAO also counteracts the protein-destabilizing tendencies of urea and of deep-water pressure. Its presence in the tissues of both elasmobranch and teleost fish has been found to increase with depth.

The blood of Greenland sharks contains three major types of hemoglobin, made up of two copies of  globin combined with two copies of three very similar  subunits. These three types show very similar oxygenation and carbonylation properties, which are unaffected by urea, an important compound in marine elasmobranch physiology. They display identical electronic absorption and resonance Raman spectra, indicating that their heme-pocket structures are identical or highly similar. The hemoglobins also have a lower affinity for O compared to temperate sharks. These characteristics are interpreted as adaptations to living at great water depths.

As food

The flesh of the Greenland shark is toxic because of the presence of high concentrations of trimethylamine oxide (TMAO). If the meat is eaten without pretreatment, the ingested TMAO is metabolized into trimethylamine, which may be a uremic toxin. Occasionally, sled dogs that eat the flesh are unable to stand up because of this effect. Similar toxic effects occur with the related Pacific sleeper shark, but not in most other shark species.

The meat can be treated for safe consumption by boiling in several changes of water, drying, or fermenting for several months to produce kæstur hákarl. Traditionally, this is done by burying the meat in boreal ground for 6–8 weeks, which presses the TMAO out of the meat and also results in partial fermentation. The meat is then dug up and hung up in strips to dry for several more months. It is considered a delicacy in Iceland.

Inuit legends
The Greenland shark's poisonous flesh has a high urea content, which gave rise to the Inuit legend of Skalugsuak, the first Greenland shark. The legend says that an old woman washed her hair in urine (a common practice to kill head lice) and dried it with a cloth. The cloth blew into the ocean to become Skalugsuak. Another legend tells of Sedna whose father cut off her fingers while drowning her, with each finger turning into a sea creature, including Skalugsuak.

The Greenland shark plays a role in cosmologies of the Inuit from the Canadian Eastern Arctic and Greenland. Igloolik Inuit believe that the shark lives within the urine pot of Sedna, goddess of the sea, and consequently its flesh has a urine-like smell, and acts as a helping spirit to shamans.

Ecological importance

Role in Arctic ecosystems
As both scavengers and active predators, Greenland sharks have established themselves as apex predators in Arctic ecosystems. They eat a wide variety of fish, seals, and other prey within these ecosystems and have an important role in the intricate food web.

Conservation and management
Greenland sharks are recognized as the longest-lived vertebrates on earth. They have a slow growth rate, late maturity period, and low fecundity, making the management and conservation of this species very important. As a result of their low productivity and extreme longevity, this species is particularly susceptible to overfishing. Therefore, Greenland sharks' longevity and conservative life history traits, in tandem with their vulnerability to accidental catching and commercial fishing, promotes a growing concern for the sustainability of this species.

Threats

The shark has historically been targeted for its liver oil up until the development of synthetic oils and cessation of export of liver oil and skin from Greenland in the 1960s. In the 1970s, the species was perceived as a problem for other fisheries in western Norway and the government subsidized a fishery in order to reduce the stock of the species. 

Approximately 3,500 individuals are taken as bycatch each year in the Atlantic and Arctic Ocean and Barents Sea. More than 1,000 individuals are caught annually from Arctic waters south to USA waters. Annual catch of Greenland shark from the Barents Sea was estimated to be around 1,200 individuals per year.

The shark is also likely affected by anthropogenic climate change, which is affecting the quantity, dynamics, and distribution of Arctic sea ice. The rate of projected loss of sea ice will continue to negatively influence the abundance, distribution and availability of prey, while, at the same time, providing greater access for fishing fleets. Further, there is greater potential for new fisheries to develop as more productive and abundant southerly species invade the warming Arctic waters.

See also

Pacific sleeper shark
Southern sleeper shark
List of sharks

Notes

References

Further reading

External links

 Greenland Shark and Elasmobranch Education and Research Group
 Canadian Museum of Nature SV Greenland Shark
 
 
 "Greenland Shark" on As It Happens 6 May 2008; CBC Radio 1(WMV file)
 Greenland shark – Video on Check123
 Old and Cold: Biology of the Greenland shark - project at Univ Copenhagen - http://mbl.ku.dk/JFSteffensen/OldAndCold/
 Old and Cold: Biology of the Greenland shark - project on ResearchGate 

Greenland shark
Fish of the Arctic Ocean
Fish of the North Atlantic
Fish of Greenland
Ovoviviparous fish
Species endangered by use as food
Greenlandic cuisine
Greenland shark
Apex predators